The following men have coached the New Zealand national rugby league team in international test competition.

In the early years no coaches were formally announced, instead a "Co-Manager" who was usually a former player was named and was responsible for the on field performances. Otherwise captains were in charge while squads were on tour.

The first man to help coach the New Zealand side was Northern Union official Jack Smith who helped the 1907-1908 New Zealand side learn the rules when they arrived in Great Britain.

Jim Rukutai is the youngest coach to coach the national side, while Stephen Kearney has won the most test matches as coach (23 as of 2015).

List of coaches

See also

List of current NRL coaches
List of current NRL Women's coaches

References

 Frank Endacott with John Coffey. Being Frank, Hodder Moa Beckett, 2002.

External links
 New Zealand coaches rugbyleagueproject.com

New Zealand rugby league lists

R
NZ